The third season of The Crown  follows the life and reign of Queen Elizabeth II. It consists of ten episodes and was released by Netflix on 17 November 2019.

Olivia Colman stars as Elizabeth, along with main cast members Tobias Menzies, Helena Bonham Carter, Ben Daniels, Jason Watkins, Marion Bailey, Erin Doherty, Jane Lapotaire, Charles Dance, Josh O'Connor, Geraldine Chaplin, Michael Maloney, Emerald Fennell, and Andrew Buchan. John Lithgow and Pip Torrens return in cameo appearances.

Premise 
The Crown traces the life of Queen Elizabeth II from her wedding in 1947 through to the early 2000s.

Season three covers the time period between 1964 and 1977, beginning with Harold Wilson's election as prime minister and ending with the Silver Jubilee of Elizabeth II. Events depicted include the unmasking of the Surveyor of the Queen's Pictures, Sir Anthony Blunt as a Soviet spy, Harold Wilson and Edward Heath's respective terms as prime minister, the Aberfan disaster, the Apollo 11 moon landing, the 1969 Investiture of Prince Charles as Prince of Wales, the death of the Duke of Windsor (the Queen’s uncle and the former King Edward VIII), the death and state funeral of Winston Churchill, and Princess Margaret's affair with Roddy Llewellyn that leads to divorce from Tony Armstrong-Jones. US President Lyndon B. Johnson and Camilla Shand also feature.

Cast

Main 

 Olivia Colman as Queen Elizabeth II
 Tobias Menzies as Prince Philip, Duke of Edinburgh, Elizabeth's husband
 Helena Bonham Carter as Princess Margaret, Countess of Snowdon, Elizabeth's younger sister
 Ben Daniels as Antony Armstrong-Jones, 1st Earl of Snowdon, known as Lord Snowdon; Princess Margaret's husband
 Jason Watkins as Harold Wilson, Prime Minister of the United Kingdom
 Marion Bailey as Queen Elizabeth The Queen Mother, King George VI's widow and Elizabeth II's mother
 Erin Doherty as Princess Anne, Elizabeth and Philip's second child and only daughter
 Charles Dance as Lord Mountbatten, Philip's ambitious uncle and brother of Princess Alice of Battenberg
 Josh O'Connor as Charles, Prince of Wales, Elizabeth and Philip's eldest child and the heir apparent

Featured
The following actors are credited in the opening titles of up to two episodes:
 John Lithgow as Sir Winston Churchill, former Prime Minister of the United Kingdom
 Clancy Brown as Lyndon B. Johnson, 36th President of the United States
 Jane Lapotaire as Princess Alice, Philip's mother
 Mark Lewis Jones as Edward Millward, Prince Charles's Welsh Teacher 
 Tim McMullan as Robin Woods, Dean of Windsor
 Derek Jacobi as Prince Edward, Duke of Windsor, formerly King Edward VIII, who abdicated
 Geraldine Chaplin as Wallis, Duchess of Windsor, the Duke of Windsor's American wife
 Michael Maloney as Edward Heath, Prime Minister of the United Kingdom
 Emerald Fennell as Camilla Shand, Charles's love interest
 Andrew Buchan as Andrew Parker Bowles, Anne's love interest; later Camilla's husband
 Harry Treadaway as Roddy Llewellyn, Margaret's lover

Recurring 

 David Rintoul as Sir Michael Adeane, Private Secretary to the Queen
 Charles Edwards as Sir Martin Charteris, Assistant Private Secretary to the Queen; later Private Secretary to the Queen
 Michael Thomas as Prince Henry, Duke of Gloucester, Elizabeth's paternal uncle
 Penny Downie as Alice, Duchess of Gloucester, Elizabeth's paternal aunt by marriage
 Alan Gill as Winkie
 Pippa Winslow as Blinkie
 Mark Dexter as Tony Benn, Postmaster General; later Minister of Technology
 Lorraine Ashbourne as Barbara Castle, Minister for Overseas Development; later Secretary of State for Transport and Secretary of State for Employment
 Aden Gillett as Richard Crossman, Ministry of Housing and Local Government; later Leader of the House of Commons 
 Sam Phillips as the Queen's equerry
 Sinéad Matthews as Marcia Williams, Harold Wilson's private secretary
 David Charles as George Thomas, Parliamentary Under-Secretary of State for the Home Department; later Secretary of State for Wales 
 Stuart McQuarrie as George Thomson, Minister without portfolio 
 Patrick Ryecart as The Duke of Norfolk, Earl Marshal 
 Connie M'Gadzah as Sydney Johnson, the Duke of Windsor's valet/footman

Notable guests 

 Samuel West as Sir Anthony Blunt, Surveyor of the Queen's Pictures
 Angus Wright as Sir Martin Furnival Jones, Director-General of MI5
 Paul Hilton as Michael Straight, American magazine publisher, novelist, patron of the arts, and a confessed spy for the KGB 

 Teresa Banham as Mary Wilson, wife of Prime Minister Harold Wilson
 Anthony Brophy as James Jesus Angleton, chief of CIA Counterintelligence
 Michael Simkins as Sir Patrick Dean, British Ambassador to the United States
 Martin McDougall as W. Marvin Watson, advisor to US president Lyndon B. Johnson
 Suzanne Kopser as Lady Bird Johnson, First Lady of the United States 
 Pip Torrens as Sir Tommy Lascelles, Private Secretary to King George VI (in flashbacks)
 Verity Russell as young Elizabeth 
 Beau Godson as young Margaret 

 Richard Harrington as Fred Phillips

 Gwyneth Keyworth as Gwen Edwards 

 Colin Morgan as John Armstrong, a Guardian journalist 
 Miltos Yerolemou as Chronos
 Nigel Whitmey as Marquis Childs, American journalist, syndicated columnist, and author 
 Colin Stinton as Lawrence E. Spivak, American publisher and journalist 
 Finn Elliot as young Philip
 Leonie Benesch as Princess Cecilie, Philip's third sister (in flashback)
 John Hollingworth as Lord Porchester, nicknamed Porchey, Horse Racing Manager to the Queen 
 Rupert Vansittart as Cecil Harmsworth King, newspaper publisher
 Julian Glover as Cecil Boyd-Rochfort, Irish thoroughbred racehorse trainer 

 Philippe Smolikowski as Alec Head, French horse trainer and breeder 
 John Finn as Arthur "Bull" Hancock, owner of thoroughbred racehorses at Claiborne Farm 
 Nia Roberts as Silvia Millward, Edward Millward's wife 
 David Summer as Thomas Parry, Principal of the University College of Wales Aberystwyth 
 Henry Dimbleby as Richard Dimbleby, BBC broadcaster
 Alan David as Ben Bowen Thomas, President of the University College of Wales Aberystwyth 

 Henry Pettigrew as Neil Armstrong, the Astronaut 
 Felix Scott as Buzz Aldrin, the Astronaut 
 Andrew-Lee Potts as Michael Collins  the Astronaut 
 Sidney Jackson as Prince Edward, Elizabeth and Philip's youngest child
 Marlo Woolley as Prince Andrew, Elizabeth and Philip's second son

 Fred Broom as Cliff Michelmore, English television presenter and producer 
 Daniel Beales as Patrick Moore, English amateur astronomer 
 Kevin Eldon as Priest Michael

 Matthew Baldwin as Kenneth Harris, The journalist who conducted The Duke and Duchess of Windsor in conversation with Kenneth Harris 
 Togo Igawa as Emperor Hirohito, Emperor of Japan
 David Wilmot as Arthur Scargill, president of the Yorkshire branch of the National Union of Mineworkers
 Stephen Riddle as Derek Parker Bowles, Andrew Parker Bowles's father
 Judith Alexander as Ann Parker Bowles, Andrew Parker Bowles's mother
 Robert Benedetti-Hall as Major Bruce Shand, Camilla Shand's father
 Nesba Crenshaw as Rosalind Shand, Camilla Shand's mother
 Louis Zegrean as young Edward "Ted" Heath
 Richard Walsh as Joe Gormley, president of the National Union of Mineworkers
 Jessica De Gouw as Lucy Lindsay-Hogg, girlfriend of Lord Snowdon; later Lucy, Countess of Snowdon
 Nancy Carroll as Lady Anne Tennant, lady-in-waiting to Princess Margaret and wife of Colin Tennant
 Richard Teverson as Colin Tennant, husband of Lady Anne Tennant
 Martin Wimbush as Sir Ronald Bodley Scott, English haematologist and expert on therapy for leukaemia and lymphoma 
 Dan Skinner as Alastair Burnet, British journalist and broadcaster  
 Tim Bentinck as Sir John Betjeman, Poet Laureate of the United Kingdom

Episodes

Production

Development 
By October 2017, early production had begun on an anticipated third and fourth season, and by the following January, Netflix confirmed the series had been renewed for a third and fourth season.

Casting 
The producers recast some roles with older actors every two seasons, as the characters age. In October 2017, Olivia Colman was cast as Queen Elizabeth II for the third and fourth seasons. By January 2018, Helena Bonham Carter and Paul Bettany were in negotiations to portray Princess Margaret and Prince Philip, respectively, for these seasons. However, by the end of the month Bettany was forced to drop out due to the time commitment required. By the end of March 2018, Tobias Menzies was cast as Philip. In early May 2018, Bonham Carter was confirmed to have been cast, alongside Jason Watkins as Prime Minister Harold Wilson. The next month, Ben Daniels was cast as Tony Armstrong-Jones for the third season, along with Erin Doherty as Princess Anne. A month later, Josh O'Connor and Marion Bailey were cast as respectively Prince Charles and the Queen Mother. In October 2018, Emerald Fennell was cast as Camilla Shand. In December 2018, Charles Dance was cast as Louis Mountbatten.

Filming 
The third season began filming in July 2018.

Music

Release 
The third season was released on Netflix worldwide in its entirety on 17 November 2019, and consists of ten episodes.

Reception 
Rotten Tomatoes reported a 90% approval rating for the third season based on 100 reviews, with an average rating of 8.54/10. Its critical consensus reads: "Olivia Colman shines, but as The Crown marches on in reliably luxurious fashion through time it finds space for the characters around her, providing ample opportunity for the appealing ensemble to gleam, too." On Metacritic, the season holds a score of 84 out of 100 based on 30 critics, indicating "universal acclaim".

Writing for The Daily Telegraph, Anita Singh called the series "by far, the best soap opera on television". The Los Angeles Timess Lorraine Ali praised the attention to historical detail and the performances, particularly from Colman and Bonham Carter. The Guardians Lucy Mangan praised the "top-notch performances", adding that the season is "so confident and so precision-engineered that you don't notice the defects". Daniel Fienberg for The Hollywood Reporter judged the cast transition to be a success, adding the series "remains a model for carefully crafted episodic storytelling".

There was some criticism of the lack of nuance within the writing. The BBC's Hugh Montgomery found it "increasingly on the nose", with the season "the best yet". Alison Rowat from The Herald opined some scenes were "over-engineered" and dialogue "too on the nose", but nevertheless that it excels as a political drama. Vultures Jen Chaney found the writing "a bit heavy-handed" in nevertheless "an absorbing, thoroughly enriching experience". Reviewing for Variety, Caroline Framke thought the series does not always succeed in humanising the royal family, but when it does, it is "as compelling a portrait of how power warps individuals, and the world along with them, as exists on TV". 

Ed Power from The Independent was less complimentary, praising Colman's performance but finding the series somewhat "colourless".

References

External links
 
 

2019 American television seasons
2019 British television seasons
3
Television series set in 1964
Television series set in 1965
Television series set in 1966
Television series set in 1967
Television series set in 1968
Television series set in 1969
Television series set in 1970
Television series set in 1971
Television series set in 1972
Television series set in 1973
Television series set in 1974
Television series set in 1975
Television series set in 1976
Television series set in 1977